Yeats Glacier is a tributary glacier about 8 miles (13 km) long, flowing west from the north side of Mount Finley to enter Shackleton Glacier just north of Lockhart Ridge, in the Queen Maud Mountains. Named by F. Alton Wade, leader of the Texas Tech Shackleton Glacier Expedition (1962–63 and 1964–65), for Vestal L. Yeats, a member of the Texas Technological College (now Texas Tech University) faculty and of both expeditions.

Queen Maud Mountains
Glaciers of Dufek Coast